Julio Pazos Barrera (Baños, 1944) is a poet, writer, teacher, and cook.

He is the editor-in-chief of the magazine Letras del Ecuador (Letters from Ecuador) published by the Ecuadorian House of Culture, and editor-in-chief of the magazine América.

He is a member of the Ecuadorian Academy of Language.

He was awarded Ecuador's National Prize in Literature "Premio Eugenio Espejo" in 2010 by the President of Ecuador.

Awards
 First Prize and Medal. Poetry Contest, Catholic University of Ecuador (1968)
 First Prize. Conrado Blanco Foundation of Madrid, Homage to Quito (1973
 National Literature Prize "Aurelio Espinosa Pólit" (1979)
 "Casa de las Américas" Prize, Havana, Cuba (1982)
 “Juan León Mera” Distinction Award from the city of Ambato (1988)
 "Jorge Carrera Andrade" Prize from the city of Quito (1988)
 “Juan Montalvo” Distinction Award from the city of Ambato (1994)
 Gold Medal “Aurelio Espinosa Pólit” for letters and culture, city of Quito (2006)
 Premio Eugenio Espejo (2010)

Works

 Plegaria azul (1963)	
 Ocupaciones del buscador (Quito, 1971)	
 Prendas tan queridas las palabras entregadas al vuelo (1974)	
 Entre las sombras y las iluminaciones (1977)	
 Entre las sombras las iluminaciones (1977)	
 La ciudad y las visiones (1980)		
 Levantamiento del país con textos libres (1982)	
 Ensayo: "Medardo Angel Silva" Estudio introductorio (1983)	
 Oficios (1984)	
 Contienda entre la vida y la muerte o Personajes volando en un lienzo (1985)	
 "La voragine". Estudio introductorio (1985)	
 Mujeres (1988)	
 "La victoria de Junín y otros poemas". Estudio introductorio (1988)	
 Cocina criolla, cocinemos lo nuestro (1990)	
 Literatura popular: versos y dichos de Tungurahua (1991)	
 Constancias (1993)	
 "Oposición a la magia de Francisco Proaño Arandi". Estudio introductorio (1994)	
 Juan León Mera: una visión actual (1996)	
 Holograma (1997)	
 Acercamiento a la obra de Oscar Efrén Reyes (1997)	
 Arte de la memoria (1998).	
 Días de pesares y delirios (2001)
 El sabor de la memoria (2008)

References 

1944 births
Ecuadorian male writers
Living people
Academic staff of the Pontifical Catholic University of Ecuador
People from Baños Canton